Borisovka is the name of several inhabited localities in Russia.

Altai Krai
As of 2010, two rural localities in Altai Krai bear this name:
Borisovka, Uglovsky District, Altai Krai, a selo in Laptevsky Selsoviet of Uglovsky District
Borisovka, Yegoryevsky District, Altai Krai, a selo in Kruglo-Sementsovsky Selsoviet of Yegoryevsky District

Republic of Bashkortostan
As of 2010, three rural localities in the Republic of Bashkortostan bear this name:
Borisovka, Aurgazinsky District, Republic of Bashkortostan, a village in Ibrayevsky Selsoviet of Aurgazinsky District
Borisovka, Sharansky District, Republic of Bashkortostan, a village in Michurinsky Selsoviet of Sharansky District
Borisovka, Sterlibashevsky District, Republic of Bashkortostan, a village in Bakeyevsky Selsoviet of Sterlibashevsky District

Belgorod Oblast
As of 2013, four inhabited localities in Belgorod Oblast bear this name:

Urban localities
Borisovka, Borisovsky District, Belgorod Oblast, a settlement in Borisovsky District

Rural localities
Borisovka, Krasnogvardeysky District, Belgorod Oblast, a khutor in Krasnogvardeysky District
Borisovka, Shebekinsky District, Belgorod Oblast, a selo in Shebekinsky District
Borisovka, Volokonovsky District, Belgorod Oblast, a selo in Borisovsky Rural Okrug of Volokonovsky District

Chelyabinsk Oblast
As of 2010, three rural localities in Chelyabinsk Oblast bear this name:
Borisovka, Kunashaksky District, Chelyabinsk Oblast, a village in Kunashaksky Selsoviet of Kunashaksky District
Borisovka, Plastovsky District, Chelyabinsk Oblast, a selo in Borisovsky Selsoviet of Plastovsky District
Borisovka, Yemanzhelinsky District, Chelyabinsk Oblast, a settlement under the administrative jurisdiction of the town of Yemanzhelinsk, Yemanzhelinsky District

Ivanovo Oblast
As of 2010, one rural locality in Ivanovo Oblast bears this name:
Borisovka, Ivanovo Oblast, a village in Palekhsky District

Kaluga Oblast
As of 2010, one rural locality in Kaluga Oblast bears this name:
Borisovka, Kaluga Oblast, a village in Peremyshlsky District

Kostroma Oblast
As of 2010, one rural locality in Kostroma Oblast bears this name:
Borisovka, Kostroma Oblast, a village in Chapayevskoye Settlement of Krasnoselsky District

Krasnodar Krai
As of 2010, one rural locality in Krasnodar Krai bears this name:
Borisovka, Krasnodar Krai, a selo in Primorsky Rural Okrug under the administrative jurisdiction of the City of Novorossiysk

Kursk Oblast
As of 2010, three rural localities in Kursk Oblast bear this name:
Borisovka, Khomutovsky District, Kursk Oblast, a village in Maleyevsky Selsoviet of Khomutovsky District
Borisovka, Lgovsky District, Kursk Oblast, a selo in Borisovsky Selsoviet of Lgovsky District
Borisovka, Shchigrovsky District, Kursk Oblast, a village in Okhochevsky Selsoviet of Shchigrovsky District

Lipetsk Oblast
As of 2010, one rural locality in Lipetsk Oblast bears this name:
Borisovka, Lipetsk Oblast, a selo in Borisovsky Selsoviet of Dobrovsky District

Moscow Oblast
As of 2010, three rural localities in Moscow Oblast bear this name:
Borisovka, Podolsky District, Moscow Oblast, a village in Strelkovskoye Rural Settlement of Podolsky District
Borisovka, Shakhovskoy District, Moscow Oblast, a village in Stepankovskoye Rural Settlement of Shakhovskoy District
Borisovka, Shchyolkovsky District, Moscow Oblast, a village in Trubinskoye Rural Settlement of Shchyolkovsky District

Nizhny Novgorod Oblast
As of 2010, four rural localities in Nizhny Novgorod Oblast bear this name:
Borisovka, Bor, Nizhny Novgorod Oblast, a village in Sitnikovsky Selsoviet of the city of oblast significance of Bor
Borisovka, Sechenovsky District, Nizhny Novgorod Oblast, a village in Verkhnetalyzinsky Selsoviet of Sechenovsky District
Borisovka, Sergachsky District, Nizhny Novgorod Oblast, a selo in Andreyevsky Selsoviet of Sergachsky District
Borisovka, Voskresensky District, Nizhny Novgorod Oblast, a village in Bogorodsky Selsoviet of Voskresensky District

Novgorod Oblast
As of 2010, one rural locality in Novgorod Oblast bears this name:
Borisovka, Novgorod Oblast, a village in Okhonskoye Settlement of Pestovsky District

Omsk Oblast
As of 2010, one rural locality in Omsk Oblast bears this name:
Borisovka, Omsk Oblast, a village in Staromalinovsky Rural Okrug of Nizhneomsky District

Orenburg Oblast
As of 2010, one rural locality in Orenburg Oblast bears this name:
Borisovka, Orenburg Oblast, a selo in Borisovsky Selsoviet of Ponomaryovsky District

Oryol Oblast
As of 2010, two rural localities in Oryol Oblast bear this name:
Borisovka, Kromskoy District, Oryol Oblast, a village in Gostomlsky Selsoviet of Kromskoy District
Borisovka, Sverdlovsky District, Oryol Oblast, a village in Krasnoarmeysky Selsoviet of Sverdlovsky District

Penza Oblast
As of 2010, one rural locality in Penza Oblast bears this name:
Borisovka, Penza Oblast, a village in Pavlo-Kurakinsky Selsoviet of Gorodishchensky District

Primorsky Krai
As of 2010, one rural locality in Primorsky Krai bears this name:
Borisovka, Primorsky Krai, a selo under the administrative jurisdiction of Ussuriysk City Under Krai Jurisdiction

Pskov Oblast
As of 2010, one rural locality in Pskov Oblast bears this name:
Borisovka, Pskov Oblast, a village in Pechorsky District

Rostov Oblast
As of 2010, one rural locality in Rostov Oblast bears this name:
Borisovka, Rostov Oblast, a khutor in Skosyrskoye Rural Settlement of Tatsinsky District

Ryazan Oblast
As of 2010, two rural localities in Ryazan Oblast bear this name:
Borisovka, Alexandro-Nevsky District, Ryazan Oblast, a village in Borisovsky Rural Okrug of Alexandro-Nevsky District
Borisovka, Ukholovsky District, Ryazan Oblast, a village in Yasenovsky Rural Okrug of Ukholovsky District

Saratov Oblast
As of 2010, one rural locality in Saratov Oblast bears this name:
Borisovka, Saratov Oblast, a selo in Bazarno-Karabulaksky District

Smolensk Oblast
As of 2010, one rural locality in Smolensk Oblast bears this name:
Borisovka, Smolensk Oblast, a village in Novoselskoye Rural Settlement of Smolensky District

Tambov Oblast
As of 2010, two rural localities in Tambov Oblast bear this name:
Borisovka, Mordovsky District, Tambov Oblast, a selo in Karpelsky Selsoviet of Mordovsky District
Borisovka, Petrovsky District, Tambov Oblast, a village in Krutovsky Selsoviet of Petrovsky District

Tula Oblast
As of 2010, three rural localities in Tula Oblast bear this name:
Borisovka, Belyovsky District, Tula Oblast, a village in Novodoletsky Rural Okrug of Belyovsky District
Borisovka, Shchyokinsky District, Tula Oblast, a village in Kostomarovskaya Rural Administration of Shchyokinsky District
Borisovka, Tyoplo-Ogaryovsky District, Tula Oblast, a village in Bolshe-Ogarevsky Rural Okrug of Tyoplo-Ogaryovsky District

Tver Oblast
As of 2010, two rural localities in Tver Oblast bear this name:
Borisovka, Selizharovsky District, Tver Oblast, a village in Selizharovsky District
Borisovka, Toropetsky District, Tver Oblast, a village in Toropetsky District

Tyumen Oblast
As of 2010, one rural locality in Tyumen Oblast bears this name:
Borisovka, Tyumen Oblast, a village in Butusovsky Rural Okrug of Ishimsky District

Ulyanovsk Oblast
As of 2010, one rural locality in Ulyanovsk Oblast bears this name:
Borisovka, Ulyanovsk Oblast, a settlement in Bryandinsky Rural Okrug of Cherdaklinsky District

Vladimir Oblast
As of 2010, one rural locality in Vladimir Oblast bears this name:
Borisovka, Vladimir Oblast, a village in Yuryev-Polsky District

Yaroslavl Oblast
As of 2010, three rural localities in Yaroslavl Oblast bear this name:
Borisovka, Breytovsky District, Yaroslavl Oblast, a village in Filimonovsky Rural Okrug of Breytovsky District
Borisovka, Myshkinsky District, Yaroslavl Oblast, a village in Bogorodsky Rural Okrug of Myshkinsky District
Borisovka, Rybinsky District, Yaroslavl Oblast, a village in Nazarovsky Rural Okrug of Rybinsky District